Almaluez is a town and municipality in Spain, located in the province of Soria, in the autonomous community of Castile-Leon, Spain.

Geography and demography

The municipality has a population of 243 (2005), of which 128 are male and 115 are female. The area is 160 km² and the density is 25.3. The altitude of the town is 822 msl.

Local administration

The mayor of Almaluez is Mr. Santiago Bordejé Hernando of the (Partido Popular). This party has all seven councillors of the town's ayuntamiento.

Elections

In the 2004 Spanish General Election, the Partido Popular got 73.9%  of the vote in Almaluez, the Partido Socialista Obrero Español got 18.3%, Iniciativa por el Desarrollo de Soria got 5.6% and Izquierda Unida got .56%.

References

External links
The town
 "Diputación de Soria"

Municipalities in the Province of Soria